Hinduism is a minority faith in East Timor. Almost all of them follow Balinese Hinduism.

History

Timor has no traditional Hindu population. Hindus are mainly migrants from Bali who came during the Indonesian occupation. After the end of the occupation, most Hindus left the country.

Demographics
In 1992, before the independence of East Timor Hindus constituted 0.5% of the population. After the occupation, Hinduism decreased to less than 0.1% in East Timor. According to the 2011 census, there are 195 Hindus in East Timor. However, the 2015 Census showed a slight increase in the absolute number of Hindus. According to that census, there were 271 Hindus in East Timor.

Temples

Pura Girinatha is the largest Balinese Hindu temple in East Timor. The temple was built during the Occupation. Now the temple is quite run down, although some Balinese from Indonesia and the East Timorese government have started efforts to revitalize the temple.

The Pongal celebration of the Tamil Hindus were also celebrated in the Pura Giri Natha.

See also
Pura Girinatha

References

Religion in East Timor
East Timur